Tetyushi (Täteş) is a town and the administrative center of Tetyushsky District in the Republic of Tatarstan, Russia, located on the right bank of the Volga River, on the shore of the Kuybyshev Reservoir,  south of Kazan, the capital of the republic. As of the 2010 Census, its population was 11,596. It was previously known as Tetyushskaya zastava

History

It was founded in 1574–1578 or in 1555–1557 as Tetyushskaya zastava. It was granted town status in 1781. In 1920–1927, it served as the administrative center of a kanton. It served as the administrative center of a district since 1930.

The town was the site of a major battle during Stepan Razin's rebellion.

Administrative and municipal status
Within the framework of administrative divisions, Tetyushi serves as the administrative center of Tetyushsky District, to which it is directly subordinated. As a municipal division, the town of Tetyushi, together with two rural localities, is incorporated within Tetyushsky Municipal District as Tetyushi Urban Settlement.

Economy
As of 1997, the town's industrial enterprises included a meat factory, a dairy, a bakery, a brewery, a fish processing, plant, a furniture plant, an animal feedstuff factory, and a branch of the Kazan Helicopters company.

Demographics

As of 1989, the population was ethnically mostly Russian (61.9%), Tatar (20.6%), Chuvash (11.6%), and Mordvin (5.1%).

Notable people
Ilyas Phaizulline, classical realist painter

References

Notes

Sources

Cities and towns in Tatarstan
Tetyushsky Uyezd
Populated places established in the 16th century